Anjani railway station is a station on Konkan Railway. It is at a distance of  down from Roha. The preceding station on the line is Khed railway station and the next station is Chiplun railway station.

References

Railway stations along Konkan Railway line
Railway stations in Ratnagiri district
Ratnagiri railway division